Four Corners is a census-designated place (CDP) in Gallatin County, Montana, United States. The population was 3,146 at the 2010 census, up from 1,828 in 2000. It is part of the Bozeman, MT Micropolitan Statistical Area.

Geography
The "Four Corners" refers to the intersection of U.S. Route 191, Montana Highway 84 and Montana Highway 85. US 191 leads east to Bozeman and south  to West Yellowstone, MT 84 leads west  to Norris, and MT 85 leads north  to Belgrade and Interstate 90.

The Gallatin River, a north-flowing tributary of the Missouri River, forms the western edge of the CDP.

Demographics

As of the census of 2000, there were 1,828 people, 761 households, and 506 families residing in the CDP. The population density was 178.4 people per square mile (68.9/km2). There were 795 housing units at an average density of 77.6 per square mile (30.0/km2). The racial makeup of the CDP was 97.43% White, 0.16% African American, 0.55% Native American, 0.49% Asian, 0.16% Pacific Islander, 0.27% from other races, and 0.93% from two or more races. Hispanic or Latino of any race were 0.98% of the population.

There were 761 households, out of which 30.1% had children under the age of 18 living with them, 55.6% were married couples living together, 7.0% had a female householder with no husband present, and 33.5% were non-families. 24.7% of all households were made up of individuals, and 5.8% had someone living alone who was 65 years of age or older. The average household size was 2.40 and the average family size was 2.87.

In the CDP, the population was spread out, with 23.0% under the age of 18, 10.1% from 18 to 24, 31.3% from 25 to 44, 25.7% from 45 to 64, and 9.9% who were 65 years of age or older. The median age was 37 years. For every 100 females, there were 112.1 males. For every 100 females age 18 and over, there were 113.2 males.

The median income for a household in the CDP was $36,964, and the median income for a family was $43,977. Males had a median income of $30,710 versus $21,146 for females. The per capita income for the CDP was $18,185. About 8.1% of families and 10.3% of the population were below the poverty line, including 12.7% of those under age 18 and 12.3% of those age 65 or over.

See also

 List of census-designated places in Montana

References

External links

Census-designated places in Gallatin County, Montana
Census-designated places in Montana